The Brook Avenue station is a local station on the IRT Pelham Line of the New York City Subway. It is served by the 6 train at all times and is located at Brook Avenue and East 138th Street in the Mott Haven neighborhood of the Bronx. The station opened in 1919 as part of an extension of the Pelham Line of the Interborough Rapid Transit Company, and had its platforms extended in the 1960s. The station is slated to undergo renovations to become compliant with the Americans with Disabilities Act of 1990.

History 
This station opened on January 7, 1919 with the extension of the Pelham Line from Third Avenue–138th Street to Hunts Point Avenue by the Interborough Rapid Transit Company.

In 1951, the MTA proposed building a transfer from the IRT Pelham Line to the IND Second Avenue Line at Brook Avenue, though that was never built. Instead, both platforms were extended at either ends in the 1960s to accommodate the current standard length of an IRT train. The extensions are noticeable as they are narrower than the rest of the platforms and have no columns. The extensions result in the platforms being slightly offset.

In 1981, the MTA listed the station among the 69 most deteriorated stations in the subway system. Under the 2015–2019 MTA Capital Plan, the station, along with thirty other New York City Subway stations, will undergo a complete overhaul and would be entirely closed for up to 6 months. Updates would include cellular service, Wi-Fi, charging stations, improved signage, and improved station lighting. However, these renovations are being deferred until the 2020–2024 Capital Program due to a lack of funding. In 2019, the MTA announced that this station would become ADA-accessible as part of the agency's 2020–2024 Capital Program.

Station layout

This underground station has three tracks and two side platforms. The center express track is used by the weekday peak direction <6> service.

Both platforms have their original Dual Contracts mosaic trim line and name tablets. The trim line has a geometric Vickers design of brightly colored diamonds in blue and green, bordered by scarlet red and yellow-ochre bands, as well as alternating "B" and concentric diamond plaques at regular intervals. The name tablets read "BROOK AVE." in white seriffed lettering on a blue background and yellow-ochre border. Some of the tablets themselves, and sections of the trim line on both sides have been replaced in recent years with historically accurate replicas. Dark yellow I-beam columns run along the original portion of the platforms at regular intervals, alternating ones having the standard black name plate with white lettering.

There are no crossovers or crossunders to allow free transfers between directions.

Exits
Both platforms have one same-level fare control area at the center. Each one has a turnstile bank, token booth, and two street stairs. The ones on the Pelham Bay Park-bound platform go up to either southern corners of Brook Avenue and East 138th Street while the ones on the Manhattan-bound platform go up to either northern corners.

References

External links 

 
 Station Reporter — 6 train
 The Subway Nut — Brook Avenue Pictures 
 Brook Avenue entrance from Google Maps Street View
 Platforms from Google Maps Street View

IRT Pelham Line stations
New York City Subway stations in the Bronx
Railway stations in the United States opened in 1919
Mott Haven, Bronx
1919 establishments in New York City